Kale is a species of cabbage in which the central leaves do not form a head.

Kale may also refer to:

Ethnography 
Kale, the Romani for "black", used as a self-designation by some groups of the Romani people:
 Finnish Kale, the Romani people from Finland
 Kale (Welsh Romanies), the Romani people from Wales

Places

Former Ottoman Empire
Kale means 'fortified place' in Turkish.

Bosnia and Herzegovina
Kale, Konjic

Crimea
Chufut-Kale, cave-fortress

Macedonia
 Kale Fortress in Skopje

Romania
 Ada Kaleh (lit. 'Fortress Island' in Turkish), former Danube island

Serbia
 Kale-Krševica, an Ancient Greek town

Turkey
 Kale, Antalya
 Kale, Borçka
 Kale, Denizli
 Kale, Malatya

India
 Kale, Mawal, Pune district, Maharashtra

Iran
 Kale, Iran, a village in Qazvin Province

Myanmar
 Kale, Kayin State
 Kale District, Sagaing Division
 Kale Township, Sagaing Division

Slovenia
 Kale, Slovenia, a small village in the Municipality of Žalec

Nepal
 Kale, Nepal

United States
 Kale, West Virginia

People
 Kale (name), a unisex given name used largely in the English and Hawaiian languages, and a surname

Other uses 
 Kale (moon), a moon of Jupiter
 Kale (Dragon Ball), a character from the Dragon Ball multimedia franchise
 Kale, a local name for West African pepper
 HMS Kale, ships of Britain's navy
 Kale (mythology), one of the Charites (Graces), daughters of Zeus (Jupiter)
 KALE, a radio station on 960 AM licensed to Richland, Washington

See also 
 Bowen's Kale
 Master Kale
 Kail (surname)
 Cale (disambiguation)
 Qaleh (disambiguation)
 Kalo (disambiguation)